Edison Bugg's Invention is a 1916 American silent comedy film featuring Oliver Hardy.

Cast
 Raymond McKee - Edison Bugg
 Oliver Hardy - The Fire Chief (as Babe Hardy)
 Jerold T. Hevener

Plot
The firemen are so engrossed in their card playing that they ignore the fire alarm. Edison Bugg's  invention yanks their chairs out from under them when the alarm sounds.

See also
 List of American films of 1916
 Oliver Hardy filmography

External links

1916 films
American silent short films
American black-and-white films
1916 comedy films
1916 short films
Silent American comedy films
American comedy short films
1910s American films